"These Girls" is a song performed by American boy band Why Don't We. The song was released as a digital download on August 30, 2017 by Signature and Atlantic Records. The song was written by Davisd Loeffler, John Mitchell, John Monds, Ryan Baharloo and TJ Routon. The song peaked at number four on the US Bubbling Under Hot 100 Singles chart and number eighty-two on the Canadian Hot 100. It is included on the Japanese edition of the band's debut studio album 8 Letters.

A version of the song remixed by Sagan was released on November 16. An acoustic version of the song was released on December 6.

Background
The song was inspired by the fans Why Don't We met when they toured America during their Something Different Tour. "We’ve been all through the country and were inspired by you", said the band in a post promoting the song.

Music video
A music video to accompany the release of "These Girls" was first released onto YouTube on August 30, 2017. The video was directed by Eli Sokhn and Logan Paul. The video shows the band surrounded by the girls they sing about, and ends with a confetti-showered dance party.

Awards and nominations

Track listing

Personnel
Credits adapted from Tidal.
 Corbyn Besson – vocals
 Daniel Seavey – vocals
 Jack Avery – vocals
 Jonah Marais – vocals
 Zach Herron – vocals
 Davisd Loeffler – writer
 John Mitchell – writer
 John Monds – writer
 Ryan Baharloo – writer
 TJ Routon – writer

Charts

Release history

References

2017 songs
Why Don't We songs